Antimicrobial chemotherapy is the clinical application of antimicrobial agents to treat infectious disease.

There are five types of antimicrobial chemotherapy:
 Antibacterial chemotherapy, the use of antibacterial drugs to treat bacterial infections
 Antifungal chemotherapy, the use of antifungal drugs to treat fungal infections
 Anthelminthic chemotherapy, the use of antihelminthic drugs to treat worm infections
 Antiprotozoal chemotherapy, the use of antiprotozoal drugs to treat protozoan infections
 Antiviral chemotherapy, the use of antiviral drugs to treat viral infections

See also
 Antimicrobial Agents and Chemotherapy
 British Society for Antimicrobial Chemotherapy
 Chemotherapy (journal)
 Journal of Antimicrobial Chemotherapy
 Chemotherapy#The term chemotherapy

Antimicrobials